Du Zhiguo (born 29 September 1954) is a Chinese actor.

Life
Du joined the performing arts troupe of Tianjin Military District (天津警备区) at the age of 16. He initially learnt dancing before joining the drama class. Seven years later, he moved to Xingtai and then to Baoding. As drama was not very popular at that time, Du travelled to Beijing in search of opportunities to start an acting career. He became more familiar to audiences after portraying Nian Gengyao in the 1998 television series Yongzheng Dynasty.

Du's first wife, Yang Li (杨丽), is a dancer. Their son Du Chun is also an actor. Du and Yang divorced later. In 2004, Du married his second wife, actress Zhao Na (赵娜).

Filmography

Film

Television

External links
 

1954 births
Living people
Male actors from Hebei
Chinese male stage actors
Chinese male film actors
Chinese male television actors
Hui male actors